Androloma disparata, the Disparate Forester, is a species of moth in the family Noctuidae (the owlet moths).

The MONA or Hodges number for Androloma disparata is 9322.

References

Further reading

 
 
 

Agaristinae
Articles created by Qbugbot
Moths described in 1884